Passalus pugionifer is a beetle of the family Passalidae.

References 

Passalidae
Beetles described in 1891